Greg Cosell is an NFL analyst and a senior producer at NFL Films. He is the nephew of late broadcaster Howard Cosell. Cosell is highly regarded by NFL insiders for his football knowledge.

Born in Queens, New York, Cosell attended Amherst College where he played basketball. After applying for a job at NFL Films, he was interviewed by founder Ed Sabol at the company's New Jersey headquarters, and subsequently hired as a producer.

In 1984, Cosell with NFL Films President Steve Sabol created a show titled Monday Night Matchup (now known as NFL Matchup) which was initially hosted by Chris Berman. The show has grown to one of the most respected sports television programs in the industry and he currently co-hosts the show with Sal Paolantonio and Darius Butler.

Cosell co-authored the book The Games That Changed the Game:  The Evolution of the NFL in Seven Sundays.

Cosell joins SiriusXM Fantasy Football Morning with John Hansen and Adam Caplan every Friday to break down the film for Fantasy Football fans. He comes into every segment with his theme song, Lawyers, Guns and Money by Warren Zevon. He is also a semi-regular contributor to MSG Western New York's midday show One Bills Live, as well as The Herd with Colin Cowherd on Fox Sports Radio and Fox Sports 1.

References

Living people
Year of birth missing (living people)
American film producers
American Jews
People from Queens, New York